Sam Kendricks (born September 7, 1992) is an American pole vaulter. He is a three-time indoor and six-time outdoor national champion (2014–2019), the 2016 Olympics bronze medalist, and the 2017 World Champion. In 2019, Kendricks set the American pole vault record at 6.06 m, tying him with Steve Hooker for fourth all time.  He later won the gold medal at the World Championships in Doha.

, Kendricks is a first lieutenant in the United States Army Reserve.

Prep
Kendricks vaulted for Oxford High School in Oxford, Mississippi leading his team to the 2009 MHSAA 5A State Championship.  He vaulted  to set the state record.  He won the state meet outdoors in 2010 and 2011, and indoors in 2011.  He also lettered in cross country and soccer. In 2011, he was named the Gatorade boys' high school track and field athlete of the year for Mississippi.

NCAA
While vaulting for the University of Mississippi, Kendricks won the 2013 and 2014 NCAA Championships. He broke both Ole Miss Rebels pole vault records as a freshman. Kendricks announced that he would be turning pro in 2014.

Professional

2015

2016
At the 2016 Summer Olympics, he won the bronze medal. Kendricks also garnered attention during the Olympics when he stopped mid run during a pole vault attempt to stand at attention while "The Star-Spangled Banner" was played.

2017

On June 24, 2017, Kendricks became the 22nd person to join the six meters club by vaulting exactly  while winning the 2017 USA Outdoor Track and Field Championships in Sacramento, California.

On December 29, 2017, Kendricks married Leanne Zimmer in Oxford, MS.

2019
On July 27, 2019, Kendricks set the American pole vault record by jumping 6.06 m.

2021 
Kendricks tested positive for COVID-19 in the Olympic Village, and had to withdraw from the 2020 Summer Olympics as a result, missing the pole vault competition.

Competition record

See also
6 metres club

References

External links

Sam Kendricks Ole Miss Profile
Sam Kendricks Official Website

1992 births
Living people
American male pole vaulters
American military Olympians
Athletes (track and field) at the 2016 Summer Olympics
Medalists at the 2016 Summer Olympics
Ole Miss Rebels men's track and field athletes
Olympic bronze medalists for the United States in track and field
World Athletics Championships athletes for the United States
Universiade medalists in athletics (track and field)
World Athletics Championships medalists
Sportspeople from Oxford, Mississippi
Track and field athletes from Mississippi
Olympic male pole vaulters
Universiade gold medalists for the United States
World Athletics Championships winners
IAAF Continental Cup winners
USA Outdoor Track and Field Championships winners
Diamond League winners
USA Indoor Track and Field Championships winners
Medalists at the 2013 Summer Universiade
Sportspeople from Oceanside, California
United States Army officers
United States Army reservists
Military personnel from California